Koriša is a village in the Prizren Municipality in southern Kosovo.

Politics 
Korisha is self-administering locality and does not depend on the Prizren municipality. It is also the first town in Kosovo that send girls to academic schools.

History
The village of Koriša an old settlement with a well documented history. Prior to the Ottoman expansion into the region, Koriša was a large settlement that extended out into the Brešta ridge to the east of the village. The area surrounding the village had nine Serbian Orthodox sites including the Hermitage of St. Peter of Koriša and Monastery of St. Mark of Koriša scattered within the Brešta ridge. At the turn of the 20th century, the population demographics of Koriša changed. Prior to 1912, there were between 30-40 Serbian households and by 1940, only 25 Serb homes remained with many Serb families moving permanently to Belgrade, Prizren and Niš. Throughout this time, many Albanians moved down from settlements on the Kabash Mountain into Koriša. By 1940, there were 54 Albanian households.

Kosovo War 

During the Kosovo War, more than 80% of the village was destroyed and burnt by Serbian forces. It was the site of the Korisa bombing, where NATO killed at least 87 Albanian refugees fleeing ethnic persecution.

Notable sites 
There are 3 artificial waterfalls, which are being visited by a lot of Tourists all around Kosovo.

In the right Side of Kabashi Mauntains, a part called Gralishtë, is a large not full developed Castle.
It dates from V-VI Century.

Notes and references

Notes

References

Villages in Prizren